The 3rd Lambda Literary Awards were held in 1991 to honour works of LGBT literature published in 1990.

Special awards

Nominees and winners

External links
 3rd Lambda Literary Awards

03
Lambda
Lists of LGBT-related award winners and nominees
1991 in LGBT history
1991 awards in the United States